Francisco Francisco Feliciano (19 February 1941 – 19 September 2014) was a Filipino composer and conductor. He was a National Artist of the Philippines for Music.

Life
Feliciano was born on 19 February 1941, in Morong, Rizal.

Francisco Feliciano graduated from the University of the Philippines with a Teacher's diploma in Music (1967) and a Masters in Music degree in Composition (1972). In 1977, he went to the Hochschule der Kuenste in Berlin, Germany to obtain a diploma in Music Composition. In 1979 he attended Yale University School of Music and graduated with a Master of Musical Arts and a Doctorate in Musical Arts, Composition. While at Yale University he conducted the Yale Contemporary Ensemble, considered one of the leading performing groups in America for contemporary and avant-garde music. His teachers in conducting were Arthur Weisberg and Martin Behrmann, while he studied composition under Jacob Druckman, Isang Yun, H.W. Zimmerman and Krzysztof Penderecki.

He died on September 19, 2014 in Manila at the age of 73.

List of works
Major works and arrangements include:
Buksan mo ang aming mga labi (published 1982) 
Mass of Saint Andrew (published 1981) 
Pamugun (choral, with soprano solo. published 2002) 
Pokpok alimpako (chorus. published 2002) 
Three Visayan folksongs: for high voice (published 1998)

Awards and honors
 2014 - National Artist for Music

References

External links
Francisco Feliciano - Official profile at Sambalikhaan Foundation website.

Filipino classical composers
Filipino conductors (music)
Musicians from Rizal
1941 births
2014 deaths